Ascerodes is a genus of moths belonging to the subfamily Tortricinae of the family Tortricidae.

Species
Ascerodes prochlora Meyrick, 1905

See also
List of Tortricidae genera

References

 , 1905, Trans. ent. Soc. Lond. 1905: 234.
 , 2005, World Catalogue of Insects 5

External links
tortricidae.com

Archipini
Monotypic moth genera
Tortricidae genera
Taxa named by Edward Meyrick